Linfeng Town is an urban town in Changshou District, Chongqing, People's Republic of China.

Administrative division
The town is divided into 10 villages, the following areas: Linfeng Village, Shangdong Village, Qingguan Village, Wangta Village, Shangping Village, Sanhua Village, Baojia Village, Jiaojia Village, Miaoshan Village, and Shixin Village (邻封村、上硐村、青观村、汪塔村、上坪村、三化村、保家村、焦家村、庙山村、石心村).

External links

Divisions of Changshou District
Towns in Chongqing